Michael John Anderson Mathews (born 6 January 1934) is a South African former first-class cricketer.

Mathews was born at Durban in January 1964. He later studied in England at Lincoln College at the University of Oxford. While studying at Oxford, he made two appearances in first-class cricket for Oxford University in 1957 against the Free Foresters at Oxford and Surrey at Guildford. He took 6 wickets in his two matches, with five of those wickets coming in a single innings in the match against the Free Foresters.

References

External links

1934 births
Living people
People from Durban
Alumni of Lincoln College, Oxford
South African cricketers
Oxford University cricketers